The 1981 Tel Aviv Open was a men's tennis tournament played on outdoor hard courts that was part of the 1981 Volvo Grand Prix. It was played at the Israel Tennis Centers in the Tel Aviv District city of Ramat HaSharon, Israel and was held from October 5 to October 12, 1981. It was the third edition of the tournament. First-seeded Mel Purcell won the singles title.

Finals

Singles

 Mel Purcell defeated  Per Hjertquist 6–1, 6–1
 It was Purcell's 3rd title of the year and the 3rd of his career.

Doubles

 Steve Meister /  Van Winitsky defeated  John Feaver /  Steve Krulevitz 3–6, 6–3, 6–3 
 It was Meister's only title of the year and the 1st of his career. It was Winitsky's 3rd title of the year and the 6th of his career.

References

External links
 ITF tournament edition details

 
Tel Aviv Open
Tel Aviv Open
Tel Aviv Open